The Alfa Romeo Diva is a concept car of the Italian automobile manufacturer Alfa Romeo.
The car was first shown at the Geneva Motor Show in 2006.
The car was developed through a collaboration between Centro Stile Alfa Romeo, Fiat Group's research center Elasis and the Espera design school led by Franco Sbarro.
The design of the car goes back to the icon Alfa Romeo 33 Stradale, making use of the butterfly doors. Although the car has the characteristic Alfa-nose,
the nose is much like on a Formula 1 car. The car is built on a heavily modified chassis from an Alfa Romeo 159 and a transverse mounted 3.2 liter  Busso V6.

References

Rear-wheel-drive vehicles
Diva